Sofía Barriguete Rodríguez (born 5 July 2000) is a Spanish professional racing cyclist, who most recently rode for UCI Women's Continental Team .

References

External links

2000 births
Living people
Spanish female cyclists
Place of birth missing (living people)
21st-century Spanish women